Robert Ernest Hite (February 26, 1943 – April 5, 1981) was the co-lead vocalist of the American blues and rock band Canned Heat, from 1965 to his death in 1981. His nickname was "The Bear".

Biography
Hite was introduced to Alan Wilson by Henry Vestine and the two of them helped convince blues pianist Sunnyland Slim  (1906-1995) to get back into the recording studio to record. In 1965, aged 22, Hite formed a band with Wilson. Vestine joined soon after and this trio formed the core of Canned Heat. They were eventually joined by Larry Taylor (bass) and Frank Cook (drums).

Hite performed with Canned Heat at Woodstock in August 1969. The performances were not included in the original (1970) film Woodstock, but are in the 1994 "Director's Cut" version. It appears that Canned Heat's 'Woodstock Boogie' sung by The Bear was on the original cut.

Canned Heat appeared on a November 1969 episode of Playboy After Dark. Hite was invited to talk with Hugh Hefner after the performance, along with other guests Sonny and Cher, Vic Damone, Dick Shawn and Larry Storch. A 20-year-old Lindsay Wagner, playing the part of one of Hefner's party guests, sat on Hite's lap and played a party game. When asked by Hefner what kind of animal Hite would be if he were an animal, Wagner claimed he'd be a bear. Hite told her she got it right, that people called him "The Bear." It was also on this episode that Hite informed Hugh Hefner that he had over 15,000 78s.

He produced the John Lee Hooker and Canned Heat album, Hooker 'N Heat (1971).

Death
On April 5, 1981, during a break between sets at The Palomino Club in North Hollywood, Hite was handed a vial of heroin by a fan. He snorted it and fell into a coma, after which others unsuccessfully attempted to revive him with a large dose of cocaine. A group of roadies put Hite in a van and drove him to bandmate Fito de la Parra's home, where he died.

References

External links
 

American blues harmonica players
American blues singers
American blues guitarists
American male guitarists
Canned Heat members
1943 births
1981 deaths
Musicians from Los Angeles County, California
Songwriters from California
Deaths by heroin overdose in California
People from Topanga, California
People from Torrance, California
20th-century American singers
20th-century American guitarists
Guitarists from California
20th-century American male singers
American male songwriters